Hard Bargain Airport  is a public use airport located near Long Island, the Bahamas.

See also
List of airports in the Bahamas

References

External links 
 Airport record for Hard Bargain Airport at Landings.com

Airports in the Bahamas
Long Island, Bahamas